Tuzla is a commune in Constanța County, Northern Dobruja, Romania, including the village with the same name. Its name means "saltpan" in Turkish.

Demographics
At the 2011 census, Tuzla had 5,985 Romanians (92.49%), 4  Hungarians (0.06%), 175 Turks (2.70%), 296 Tatars (4.57%), 3 Aromanians (0.05%), 8 others (0.12%).

References

Communes in Constanța County
Localities in Northern Dobruja
Place names of Turkish origin in Romania